Gompo is a small suburb of East London in South Africa.

References

Populated places in Buffalo City Metropolitan Municipality